Naldo Dasso (born 14 January 1931) is an Argentine equestrian. He competed at the 1956 Summer Olympics and the 1960 Summer Olympics.

References

External links
 

1931 births
Living people
Argentine male equestrians
Olympic equestrians of Argentina
Equestrians at the 1956 Summer Olympics
Equestrians at the 1960 Summer Olympics
People from La Pampa Province